The National Theatre, Nigeria is the primary centre for the performing arts in Nigeria. The monument is located in Iganmu, Surulere, Lagos. Its construction was completed in 1976 in preparation for the Festival of Arts and Culture (FESTAC) in 1977.

Design

Construction of The National Theatre was started by the military regime of General Yakubu Gowon and completed during the military regime of Olusegun Obasanjo. By the year 2021, this edifice had been run by a number of management teams with heads such as Jimmy Folorunso Atte (1991 – August 1999), Prof Babafemi A. Osofisan (2000 – 2004), Dr. Ahmed Parker Yerima (2006 – Aug 2009), Kabir Yusuf (2009 – 2016), George Ufot, (Late) Dr. (Mrs.) Stella Oyedepo, Professor Sunday Enessi Ododo, fsonta, FNAL.

The National Theatre exterior was designed, shaped and built to look like a military hat. It originally has capacity for a 5,000-seater Main Hall with a collapsible stage, and two capacity cinema halls, all of which are equipped with facilities for simultaneous translation of 8 languages; among others.

The National Theatre, Nigeria was designed and constructed by Bulgarian construction company (Techno Exporstroy). Alhaji Sule Katagum was a co-owner and also their chairman. It resembles the Palace of Culture and Sports in Varna, Bulgaria (completed in 1968); the National Theatre Lagos, Nigeria being the bigger of the two.

These really loved tourist centre for culture and performance amongst others is now undergoing a total revamp.

Controversy
In 2005, President Olusegun Obasanjo announced plans to privatize the National Theatre. This sparked controversy amongst Nigerian entertainers and playwrights like Wole Soyinka
On 30 December 2014, it was reported that the National Theatre has been sold to a Dubai-based conglomerate for the sum of $40million, and that the building will be converted to a duty-free shopping mall.

Appearance in media 

 Filming for the "Keys to the Kingdom" video in Beyonce's visual album Black is King took place at the National Arts Theatre, Lagos.
 Burna Boy performed a medley of his hits "Level Up", "Onyeka" and "Ye" in front of and inside the building, during the Premiere ceremony of the 63rd Grammy Awards, on March 2, 2021. Later that week, his album Twice as Tall won the Grammy Award for Best Global Music Album.

References

Further reading
FESTAC 77

External links
Official website

Theatres completed in 1976
Event venues established in 1976
National symbols of Nigeria
Tourist attractions in Lagos
Theatres in Lagos
Landmarks in Lagos
Cultural venues in Lagos
Music venues in Lagos
20th-century architecture in Nigeria